Weinmann was a Belgian professional cycling team that existed from 1989 to 1991. Its main sponsor was the Swiss bicycle parts manufacturer .

References

Cycling teams based in Belgium
Defunct cycling teams based in Belgium
1989 establishments in Belgium
1991 disestablishments in Belgium
Cycling teams established in 1989
Cycling teams disestablished in 1991